Longhope may refer to:
Longhope, Gloucestershire, England
Longhope, Hampshire, England
Longhope, Orkney, a village in Scotland
Longhope (bay) an arm of the sea between South Walls and Hoy in Orkney, Scotland
Long Hope, Eastern Cape a town in South Africa